The 2018–19 FC Bayern Munich season was the 120th season in the football club's history and 54th consecutive and overall season in the top flight of German football, the Bundesliga, having been promoted from the Regionalliga in 1965. Bayern Munich also participated in this season's edition of the domestic cup, the DFB-Pokal, and the premier continental cup competition, the UEFA Champions League. Bayern were the reigning Bundesliga champions and therefore participated in the German super cup, the DFL-Supercup. This was the 14th season for Bayern in the Allianz Arena, located in Munich, Bavaria, Germany. The season covers a period from 1 July 2018 to 30 June 2019.

Players

Squad information

Transfers

Transfers in

Transfers out

Friendly matches

Competitions

Overview

Bundesliga

League table

Results summary

Results by round

Matches

DFB-Pokal

DFL-Supercup

UEFA Champions League

Group stage

Knockout phase

Round of 16

Statistics

Appearances and goals

|-
! colspan=16 style=background:#dcdcdc; text-align:center| Goalkeepers

|-
! colspan=16 style=background:#dcdcdc; text-align:center| Defenders

|-
! colspan=16 style=background:#dcdcdc; text-align:center| Midfielders

|-
! colspan=16 style=background:#dcdcdc; text-align:center| Forwards

|-
! colspan=16 style=background:#dcdcdc; text-align:center| Players transferred out during the season

|-

Goalscorers

Clean sheets

Disciplinary record

References

FC Bayern Munich seasons
Munich, Bayern
Bayern Munich
German football championship-winning seasons